A Very Special Love is a 2008 Filipino comedy romance film produced by Star Cinema and Viva Films and starring John Lloyd Cruz and Sarah Geronimo. The film was directed by Cathy Garcia Molina and had received an “A” rating from the Cinema Evaluation Board.

The film was released on the 30th day of July 2008 and ran for eight weeks on cinemas in the Philippines. It was also released in the United States on August 15 of the same year. This movie is the first movie of Sarah Geronimo under Star Cinema in a lead female character after Sarah: The Teen Princess 13 years ago.

A sequel entitled You Changed My Life was released on February 25, 2009, and a second sequel entitled It Takes a Man and a Woman which was released on March 30, 2013. Now, it currently holds the title of the seventh highest grossing Filipino film of all time.

Plot
Laida Magtalas is a modern-day Belle. "Miggy" is the youngest member of the Montenegro clan – a well-established family in the business. She applies as an Editorial Assistant at Miggy's newly launched men’s magazine, "Bachelor". Laida revels working in such close proximity with the man of her dreams.

The film opens with Laida starting out her day for a job interview with Flippage, owned and managed by her crush Miguel "Miggy" Montenegro. Unbeknownst to her, on the day of her interview, Miggy was having a heated meeting with his creative team on the issue of the Bachelor, Flippage’s men's magazine. Miggy’s mean demeanor and undermining of both his friend and editors causes a walkout of half of the team. In the middle of the chaos, Laida was hired on the spot after she presented Miggy with coffee left by an attendant who also walked out after being screamed at.

By some stroke of luck, Laida lands the job. Laida remains blinded to the fact that the Miggy of her dreams is very different from the real one. In reality, he is an unapologetic, hothead who always thinks he's in the right and obsesses about nothing making his magazine number one. Everyone is scared of him with the exception of the love-struck Laida, who adamantly defends him. Imperceptively, she caters to his every whim, even sending her in his absence on a date with his girlfriend, breaking her heart a little. Her colleagues question her unrelenting devotion to such a monster and when Laida continues to proves her loyalty to Miggy, gossip regarding her feelings for the boss starts to circulate.

However the moment was short lived, as the next day after Laida made a suggestion in regards to an article content that Miggy should put for the magazine, Miggy publicly humiliates her and her knowledge of sex and questioned her virtue (virginity) in front of the staff by making her say the word “Sex”. Miggy later embarrassed himself after he realized that it was Laida who made the last minute call to find a printing press to do a rush job on their magazines overhaul. After being chastised by the despotic Miggy, Laida’s finally opens her eyes and sees him for the tyrant he truly is.

The confrontation with Laida was a rude awakening for Miggy as well and he realizes why people are so put-off by him.

Miggy then tries with much difficulty on his part of apologizing in his own way to Laida. First by ordering pizza for the team and serving a slice himself to her, which Laida ignores. Laida, now disenchanted with Miggy was called in by her work. However upon arriving in Miggy’s apartment, she found him high with fever with very little food or necessities in his apartment, with no househelp or family to care for him. Laida took care of Miggy, missing her own mother's birthday. Miggy woke up during a break in fever and saw the exhausted Laida next to him patting his back as a mother would to a sick child. This prompted Miggy to realize his feelings for Laida igniting a change in him and wishing Laida to be more closer to him, as well as being more friendly with the rest of his team. The productivity and atmosphere of the company also changed on a positive note. Miggy became comfortable enough to tell Laida the truth about his past, that he was an illegitimate child of his father, who was later adopted into the main family after his mother's death. Thus, his strong desire is to prove himself to his father and older brother. For the first time in his life, Miggy garners the gumption to apologize and this new-found humility opens up a whole new world of “firsts” for Miggy. With Laida's help, Miggy slowly learns to be more of a team player and the true value of loyalty.

Cast and characters

 John Lloyd Cruz as Miguel "Miggy" Montenegro
 Sarah Geronimo as Adelaida "Laida" Magtalas
 Dante Rivero as Luis Montenegro
 Rowell Santiago as Arturo "Art" Montenegro
 Johnny Revilla as Roger Montenegro
 Bing Pimentel as Alice Montenegro
 Daphne Oseña-Paez as Anya Montenegro
 Al Tantay as Tomas Magtalas
 Irma Adlawan as Baby Magtalas
 Arno Morales as Stephen Magtalas
 Miles Ocampo as Rose Magtalas
 Andre Garcia as Lion Magtalas
 Matet de Leon as Zoila
 Gio Alvarez as Vincent
 Joross Gamboa as John Rae
 Paw Diaz as Mitch
 Bernard Palanca as Mondy
 Will Devaughn as Cris
 Kalila Aguilos as Violy
 Valerie Weigmann as Dianne

Reception
The film was a huge box office success, it became the highest grossing Filipino film of 2008. It earned ₱179,235,324 in its entire run.

Filming locations
 Manila, Metro Manila, Luzon, Philippines
 Marikina, Metro Manila, Luzon, Philippines
 Pasig, Metro Manila, Luzon, Philippines
 Tagaytay City, Cavite, Luzon, Philippines
 La Mesa Dam, Eco Park, Quezon City, Philippines

Soundtrack listing
 Very Special Love
 Performed by Sarah Geronimo
 Composed by Michael Lloyd
 Published by Warner/Chappell Music Philippines
 Originally by Maureen McGovern
 Kailan
 Composed by Ryan Cayabyab
 Published by Filscap
 Ngiti
 Performed by Ronnie Liang
 Lyrics and Music by Vince Katinday
 Arranged by Tito Rapadas
 Published by Universal Records

Awards

References

External links
 
 

2008 films
Films directed by Cathy Garcia-Molina
2008 romantic comedy films
2000s Tagalog-language films
Star Cinema films
Viva Films films
Philippine romantic comedy films
2000s English-language films